Ayushman Mitra is an Indian fashion designer, painter, and actor from Kolkata. He is the owner of fashion label Bobo Calcutta and was a featured GenNext designer at Lakme Fashion Week Summer/Resort 2018.

Early life

Mitra was born in Kolkata, West Bengal, India to a cosmopolitan family.

Mitra eventually graduated from St. Xavier's College, Kolkata. Around this time, Mitra started painting professionally and got into group and solo exhibitions.

Career
Mitra worked on sets for music festivals like the Bacardi NH7 Weekender.

Mitra's Bobo Calcutta label pushing the envelope on topics some might find uneasy. Mitra also had a role in the film Cosmic Sex.

References

External links

1989 births
Living people
21st-century Indian male actors
Indian male fashion designers
Indian male painters
People from Kolkata
St. Xavier's College, Kolkata alumni